Barr may refer to:

Places
 Barr (placename element), element of place names meaning 'wooded hill', 'natural barrier'
 Barr, Ayrshire, a village in Scotland
 Barr Building (Washington, DC), listed on the US National Register of Historic Places 
 Barr Castle, ruin in Renfrewshire, Scotland
 Barr Castle, in Galston, East Ayrshire, Scotland
 Barr, Bas-Rhin, a commune of the Bas-Rhin département in France
 Barr Township, Daviess County, Indiana, US
 Barr Township, Cambria County, Pennsylvania, US

Companies
 A.G. Barr, a Scottish soft drinks manufacturer
 Barr Construction Ltd, a Scottish construction company
 Barr Pharmaceuticals, a generic drug manufacturer that was acquired by Teva Pharmaceutical in 2008

People
 Barr (surname)
 Brendan Fowler, a.k.a. BARR, American musician
 Barr (tribe), a people in southwest Asia

Other uses 
 Barr body, the inactive chromosome in a somatic cell
 Al-Barr, one of the names of God in Islam

See also 
 Barre (disambiguation)
 Bar (disambiguation)